Kauhava is a town and municipality of Finland.

The popular amusement park, PowerPark, is located in Alahärmä, Kauhava.

The municipality is unilingually Finnish.

Geography
The surrounding country is flat and well suited to agriculture, alternating between fields and forests. The town probably takes its name from the small river which passes through it.

History
Kauhava was the home of the Finnish Training Air Wing from 1929 until the end of 2014.

The surrounding municipalities of Alahärmä, Kortesjärvi and Ylihärmä were consolidated with Kauhava on 1 January 2009.

Knife making
A traditional industry in Kauhava is knife making, and many Finns recognize the name of this small town because of knives made there. At one time, as many as five different knife-making enterprises were underway in the town, but today there is only one – Iisakki Järvenpää Oy, which has been making knives in Kauhava since 1879.

The puukko (one of the styles of Finnish knife) made in Kauhava are sometimes referred to as being in the Ostrobothnian style.

Each June sees the Kauhava International Knife Festival, lasting a couple of days and including knife exhibitions, knife making and knife throwing.

Museums
As with many Finnish localities, there are museums in Kauhava (Kauhava-Seura). One in the center of town features both the knifemaking tradition as well as the local textiles. An out-of-place fishing lure is one interesting feature of this museum. Another museum on the outskirts of Kauhava features the 19th century home and farm of Iisakin Jussi. It provides a view of late 19th century life in Western Finland. The Iisakin Jussi House is not open during the winter months.

International relations

Twin towns — Sister cities
Kauhava is twinned with:

  Rapla, Estonia
  Rygge, Norway
  Skærbæk, Denmark  
  Vimmerby Municipality, Sweden  
  Þorlákshöfn, Iceland

See also
 Finnish national road 19
 Jussi Pernaa, professional ice hockey player born in Kauhava

References

External links

 Town of Kauhava — Official website

 
Cities and towns in Finland
Populated places established in 1867